ROTOR was an elaborate air defence radar system built by the British Government in the early 1950s to counter possible attack by Soviet bombers. To get it operational as quickly as possible, it was initially made up primarily of WWII-era systems, notably the original Chain Home radars for the early warning role, and the AMES Type 7 for plotting and interception control. Data from these stations was sent to a network of control stations, mostly built underground, using an extensive telephone and telex network.

Work also began on a new microwave frequency radar to replace Chain Home . The experimental system Green Garlic was so successful that it began replacing Chain Home starting in 1954. In service, these proved so accurate that they could replace the Type 7 radars as well, and their greatly improved range meant that fewer radars would be needed to provide coverage over the entire United Kingdom. This led to the Master Radar Stations that filled both early warning and ground controlled interception roles. The original ROTOR plans for 66 radars was repeatedly reduced, ultimately only requiring half that number of stations. Many of the operations rooms, recently completed, were sold.

ROTOR called for the continual upgrading of the network over time, both the radars and the command and control systems. The introduction of the carcinotron radar jammer in the mid-1950s was a serious blow to these plans; a single aircraft carrying a carcinotron could jam the ROTOR radars so completely that they were rendered useless. At the same time, the introduction of the hydrogen bomb and ballistic missile greatly changed the nature of the strategic threat, and the idea of whole-country defence became untenable. The only way to defend against missile attacks was deterrence, and if that failed, interceptor aircraft and missiles would have no measurable effect on the eventual outcome.

ROTOR was initially to be replaced by a new network dedicated largely to defending the V-bomber force, the "1958 Plan". This role was eventually abandoned, leaving only the task of locating aircraft carrying jammers to keep the BMEWS radars free from interference and prevent a successful sneak attack by missiles. Such a system did not require a large number of radars nor country-wide coverage. To reduce the cost of this much smaller network, studies on integrating the military radars with civilian air traffic control led to the Linesman/Mediator system of only five primary stations. The original ROTOR was replaced by Linesman in stages, starting in 1967.

A similar expedient system in the United States was the Lashup Radar Network.

Post-war situation
UK radar operations were wound down late in the war, and by the time the war ended were already largely unused. It was assumed that another war was at least ten years away, and the need for any improvements in the cobbled-together system seemed remote.

Thinking changed dramatically in 1949 with the Soviet test of their first atom bomb. It was known that the Soviets had made exact copies of the B-29 Superfortress as the Tupolev Tu-4, and these aircraft had the performance needed to reach the UK with a nuclear payload. Studying the problem, the 1949 Cherry Report suggested that the 170 existing Royal Air Force radar stations be reduced to 66 sites and the electronics extensively upgraded.

Most of the new network would be made up of 28 rebuilt Chain Home systems, while the rest were taken from the existing selection of Chain Home Low, Chain Home Extra Low and the various Ground-controlled interception (GCI) radars that had formerly served special purposes. This was, in part, a stop-gap measure anticipating the availability of the dramatically improved radar known as the Microwave Early Warning, which was expected in the 1957 time-frame. Interception guidance would still be handled by existing systems in either case.

All of the radars were to be improved in terms of siting, with the addition of hardened control bunkers to protect the operators from a conventional attack. On the east coast, where a Soviet attack would be most likely, the bunkers were underground in the 'R' series (R1, R2, R3 and R4 etc.), while those on the western side of the UK were generally semi-sunken hardened structures ('R6') or above ground 'Secco' type huts (Hartland Point etc.). The R-series bunkers themselves were otherwise similar, featuring  concrete walls with all equipment, operations generators and air conditioning located inside.

Additionally, ROTOR re-arranged the existing RAF Fighter Command structure into six "Sector Operational Commands" (SOC) with their own command bunkers (three level 'R4' protected accommodation). Only four of these were built. Additional "Anti-Aircraft Operations Rooms" were built to coordinate the British Army's AA defences in the same overall system. The entire network of bunkers, radars, fighter control and command centres used up 350,000 tons of concrete, 20,000 tons of steel and thousands of miles of telephone and telex connections.

The work was mainly carried out by the Marconi Wireless and Telegraph Company in several phases, called ROTOR 1, ROTOR 2 and ROTOR 3.

Post-ROTOR
As work on the Microwave Early Warning system began, researchers at the Royal Radar Establishment were experimenting with new cavity magnetrons and crystal detectors that, combined with a ad hoc antenna, increased the range of their existing microwave radars on the order of four times. While the resulting "Green Garlic" did not meet all of the requirements for the original MEW, it was close enough and would be available years earlier.

Installations, under the name AMES Type 80, began in 1954 with the first systems declared operational the next year. As installations continued, it was found that the accuracy was such that it could also be used to direct the interceptors, with no need to forward the information to the ROTOR control centres. By concentrating all of the plotting at a single site the total number of operators was greatly reduced.

As a result of the introduction of the Type 80, many of the existing ROTOR sites were rationalized into Master Radar Stations (MRS), while the rest were made redundant, some only two years after opening. During the same period, the introduction of the first surface-to-air missiles rendered the anti-aircraft guns obsolete, and the Army handed the air defence mission entirely to the RAF. All of the AAOR sites were closed.

A few of the ROTOR and AAOR stations were re-used for Regional Seats of Government or local authority wartime headquarters. Until the end of the Cold War, many of the sites were retained by the government. They were later sold to private buyers, converted into museums (for example Hack Green) or transferred to the National Air Traffic Control Centre.

UK sites

At the Radar Research Establishment in Malvern, Worcestershire a ROTOR bunker was constructed above ground to allow equipment to be tested in an operational environment. The building, locally designated as H Building, originally incorporated a replica of the sector operations centre at RAF Bawburgh. The building was demolished June 2020.

The sites today
RAF Staxton Wold is the only Chain Home site still used as a military radar site but with no remains of the CH station on site after being rebuilt for Linesman/Mediator in 1964. Today it is the former home of an RAF TPS 77 RRH (remote radar head).

RAF Boulmer is a working RAF building, which is housed in an ex-"ROTOR" R3 
RAF Boulmer ('EZS') GCI R3 ROTOR Radar Station & Control and Reporting Centre in the UK Air Surveillance and Control System.

In terms of current condition, the ROTOR sites vary from demolished to intact.

For example, West Myne in Somerset was the last ROTOR 3 CHEL site. It was completed in 1957 after the introduction of the Type 80 radar and after many ROTOR stations had already closed. The site was within Exmoor National Park and its creation was strenuously opposed by the National Trust who lost no time in obliterating the site immediately after closure.

Many of the buildings have been re-purposed since being active as ROTOR sites. An example is the Bawburgh R4 SOC which was re-purposed as SRHQ4.1 and then RGHQ4.1 to suit the evolving needs of government. The building is intact, but it has been significantly reconfigured since its use as a ROTOR SOC, notably with the addition of an extra floor and the flooring-over of the original R4 operations well.

July 2019; Kent Underground Exploration are starting talks with TDC hoping to be given access to find and uncover the Foreness, Kent station which grid ref is TR 385710

References

Further reading
Watching the Skies, Jack Gough, HMSO 1993, 
Cold War: Building for Nuclear Confrontation 1946-89, Cocroft, Thomas and Barnwell, English Heritage 2003,

External links
 The ROTOR radar system
 R3 Anstruther bunker, now a museum
 The Rotor Radar System, explanations & photographs
 Page about ROTOR at Subterranea Britannica
 Modern aerial photographs of 'retained' Chain Home and ROTOR sites

Military radars of the United Kingdom
History of the Royal Air Force
United Kingdom nuclear command and control
Air defence radar networks